The following is a list of football clubs in Estonia.

#
1188 Infoabi

A
FC A&A Kinnisvara
FC ABB
FC Abja
FC Ahtamar Tallinn
Ajax Lasnamäe
PSK Alexela
Ambla Vallameeskond
FC Ararat Tallinn
FC Aspen
FC Atletik Tallinn
JK Atli Rapla

B
FC Balteco
FC Bestra

C
Castovanni Eagles
Charma Tabasalu
FC Comwell
FC Concordia Audentes Tallinn

D
FC DAG Tartu
JK Dagöplast Emmaste
SK Dvigatel

E
FC EBS Team
Eesti Koondis
JK Eesti Põlevkivi Jõhvi
FC Elva
Hiiumaa ÜJK Emmaste
EMÜ SK
FC Energia
Spordiselts ESDAG Tartu
F.C.A. Estel Tallinn
Esteve Maardu
FC Eston Villa
JS Estonia Tallinn

F
FC Flora Järva-Jaani
FC Flora Kehtna
FC Flora Tallinn
FC Flora II Tallinn
FC Flora (women)
Fortuna Tallinn

G
FC Goll
WC Guwalda Pärnu

H
FC Haiba
FC Hansa United
FC HansaNet.ee
Harju JK Laagri
FC HaServ Tartu
FC Hiiu Kalur Kärdla
FC Hell Hunt

I
FC Igiliikur Viimsi
SK Imavere
Infonet Tallinn
Infonet II Tallinn
International

J
JK Jalgpallihaigla
FC Joker Raasiku
FC Jüri

K
JK Kadakas Kernu
JK Kaitseliit Kalev
Kalevi SK Pärnu
JK Karksi
Keemik Kohtla-Järve
Kehra JK Piraaja
Keila JK
Keskerakonna JK
Kick Sai Narva
FC Kiiu
SK Kirm
Koeru SK
Kohtla-Järve JK Alko
Kohtla-Järve FC Lootus
Kohtla-Järve JK Järve
Kose
JK Kotkad Tallinn
JK Kotkad Viljandi
Kristiine JK
KSKM Tallinn
Kuressaare
Kuressaare II
FC Kuristiku
Kuusalu JK Rada
Rahvaspordiklubi Kuuse
Kärdla Linnameeskond

L
Laagri Saue
FC Lantana Tallinn
Legion Tallinn
FC Lelle
SK Lemons
FC Levadia Maardu
FC Levadia Pärnu
FC Levadia Tallinn
FC Levadia II Tallinn
FC Levadia III
FC Levadia Tallinn (women)
Lihula JK
LiVal Sport Tallinn
JK Liverpool Pub
Lokomotiv Jõhvi
Loksa Rahvaspordiklubi
JK Loo
FC Lootos Põlva
FC Lootos Põlva (women)
FC Lootus Alutaguse
FC Lootus Kohtla-Järve
LNSK Pantrid Tallinn
Luunja
Lõuna-Läänemaa JK
Läänemaa JK
JK Löök Tartu

M
FC Maardu
Maardu Linnameeskond
Maardu United
FC Majandusmagister
FC M.C. Tallinn
SK Mercury Tallinn
FC Metec Tartu
FC Meteor Tallinn
Metropool Pärnu
FC Mets&Puu
JK Minevik
Muhumaa JK
FC Mõigu-Rae
Märjamaa Kompanii

N
Narva Trans
Narva United FC
Navi Vutiselts
FC Nikol Tallinn
Noorus 96 Jõgeva
FC Norma Tallinn
Nõmme Kalju FC
Nõmme Kalju FC U21
Nõmme United

O
Olympic Olybet Tallinn
FC Otepää

P
Paide Linnameeskond
Paide Linnameeskond II
Pakri SK
Pärnu Jalgpalliklubi
Pärnu JK
Pärnu JK Poseidon
Pärnu Kalakombinaat/MEK
Pärnu Linnameeskond
Piraaja Tallinn
Pirita JK Reliikvia
FC Puuma
Põhja-Sakala
Põhja-Tallinna JK
Põhja-Tallinna JK Volta
JK Püsivus Kohila

Q
FC Q United
Quattromed Tartu

R
Raasiku FC Joker
Rakvere JK Tarvas
FC Reaal Tallinn
S.C. Real Maardu
S.C. Real Tallinn
JK Reliikvia Pirita
JK Retro
FC Risti
JK Rock & Roll
Räpina SK
Rummu Dünamo

S
Saaremaa JK
SaareMaa JK aaMeraaS
Saku JK
FC Santos Tartu
Saue JK
Sillamäe Kalev
SK 10 Premium Tartu
FC Soccernet
FC Spiritas
JK Sport Põltsamaa

Š
FC Štrommi Tallinn

T
JK Tabasalu
Tabasalu JK
FC Tabivere
JK Tajak
Tallinn C.F.
Tallinna JS Estonia
Tallinna Jalgpalliklubi
Tallinna JK Augur
Tallinna JK Dünamo
Tallinna JK Legion
Tallinna Kalev
Tallinna Kalev (women)
Tallinna Lõvid
Tallinna Puhkekodu
Tallinna Sadam
Tallinna Sport
Tallinna Ülikool
Tallinna FC Zapoos
SK Tamme Auto Kiviõli
SK Tapa
Tartu JK Tammeka
Tartu JK Tammeka (women)
Tartu Ülikool Fauna
Tartu FC Merkuur
Tartu JK Merkuur
FC Tarvastu
JK Tervis Pärnu
FC Tevalte
TJK-83 Tallinn
Tondi
FC Toompea
FC Toompea 1994
Tõrva
Järvakandi JK Tribling
Trummi SK
Tulevik Viljandi
Tulevik II Viljandi
Turba NJK
FC TVMK Tallinn
FC Twister Tallinn
SK Tääksi
T.F.T. Töfting
Türi Ganvix

V
FC Valga
JK Vall Tallinn
FC Vaprus Pärnu
JK Vaprus Vändra
FC Vastseliina
FC Velldoris
KSK Vigri Tallinn
Viimsi JK
Viimsi MRJK
Viljandi
JK Voka
Võhma Linnameeskond
KS Võitleja Narva
JK Võru
Võru FC Helios

W
Warrior Tõrva
Warrior Valga
Welco Tartu

Ü
FC Ühinenud Depood

See also
List of active football clubs in Estonia

Estonia
Football clubs
 
Football clubs